WFHL (88.1 FM) is a radio station broadcasting a Christian radio format. Licensed to New Bedford, Massachusetts, United States.  The station is owned by New Bedford Christian Radio, Inc.

References

External links

Portuguese-American culture in Massachusetts
Portuguese-language radio stations in the United States
FHL
New Bedford, Massachusetts
Mass media in Bristol County, Massachusetts
Radio stations established in 2003
FHL